Under and In is the only studio album by the shoegaze band Glifted. It was released in 2002.

Track listing

References

2002 debut albums
Glifted albums